Playing Live in a Room is an exclusive French release EP from Norwegian duo Kings of Convenience, issued between their first and second albums.

Track listing
 "Toxic Girl"
 "Singing Softly To Me"
 "Into The Ring Of Fire"
 "Parr-A-Pluie"
 "Until You Understand"

2004 EPs
2004 live albums
Live EPs

it:Riot on an Empty Street
sv:Riot on an Empty Street